Ashford Hill Woods and Meadows is a  biological Site of Special Scientific Interest near Ashford Hill in Hampshire.

This biologically rich site is a valley on London Clay and Lower Bagshot Beds. It has varied woodlands and agriculturally unimproved meadows. The diverse invertebrate fauna includes 31 species of butterflies and more than 400 species of moth, including the uncommon orange moth and pale oak eggar.

References

 
Sites of Special Scientific Interest in Hampshire
National nature reserves in England